Cancer bacteria are bacteria infectious organisms that are known or suspected to cause cancer. While cancer-associated bacteria have long been considered to be opportunistic (i.e., infecting healthy tissues after cancer has already established itself), there is some evidence that bacteria may be directly carcinogenic. The strongest evidence to date involves the bacterium H. pylori and its role in gastric cancer.

Oncoviruses are viral agents that are similarly suspected of causing cancer.

Known to cause cancer

Helicobacter pylori colonizes the human stomach and duodenum. In some cases it can cause stomach cancer and MALT lymphoma. Animal models have demonstrated Koch's third and fourth postulates for the role of Helicobacter pylori in the causation of stomach cancer. The mechanism by which H. pylori causes cancer may involve chronic inflammation, or the direct action of some of its virulence factors, for example, CagA has been implicated in carcinogenesis.

Speculative links
A number of bacteria have associations with cancer, although their possible role in carcinogenesis is unclear.

Salmonella Typhi has been linked to gallbladder cancer but may also be useful in delivering chemotherapeutic agents for the treatment of melanoma, colon and bladder cancer.  Bacteria found in the gut may be related to colon cancer but may be more complicated due to the role of chemoprotective probiotic cancers.  Microorganisms and their metabolic byproducts, or impact of chronic inflammation, may also be linked to oral cancers.

The relationship between cancer and bacteria may be complicated by different individuals reacting in different ways to different cancers.

History

In 1890, the Scottish pathologist William Russell reported circumstantial evidence for the bacterial cause of cancer. In 1926, Canadian physician Thomas Glover reported that he could consistently isolate a specific bacterium from the neoplastic tissues of animals and humans. One review summarized Glover's report as follows:

Glover was asked to continue his work at the Public Health Service (later incorporated into the National Institutes of Health) completing his studies in 1929 and publishing his findings in 1930. He asserted that a vaccine or anti-serum manufactured from his bacterium could be used to treat cancer patients with varying degrees of success. According to historical accounts, scientists from the Public Health Service challenged Glover's claims and asked him to repeat his research to better establish quality control. Glover refused and opted to continue his research independently; not seeking consensus, Glover's claims and results led to controversy and are today not given serious merit.

In 1950, a Newark-based physician named Virginia Livingston published a paper claiming that a specific Mycobacterium was associated with neoplasia.  Livingston continued to research the alleged bacterium throughout the 1950s and eventually proposed the name Progenitor cryptocides as well as developed a treatment protocol.  Ultimately, her claim of a universal cancer bacterium was not supported in follow up studies. In 1990 the National Cancer Institute published a review of Livingston's theories, concluding that her methods of classifying the cancer bacterium contained "remarkable errors" and it was actually a case of misclassification - the bacterium was actually Staphylococcus epidermidis.

Other researchers and clinicians who worked with the theory that bacteria could cause cancer, especially from the 1930s to the 1960s, included Eleanor Alexander-Jackson, William Coley, William Crofton, Gunther Enderlein, Franz Gerlach, Josef Issels, Elise L'Esperance, Milbank Johnson, Arthur Kendall, Royal Rife, Florence Seibert, Wilhelm von Brehmer, and Ernest Villequez. Alexander-Jackson and Seibert worked with Virginia Livingston. Some of the researchers published reports that also claimed to have found bacteria associated with different types of cancers.

See also 
 List of oncogenic bacteria
 Infectious causes of cancer
 List of human diseases associated with infectious pathogens
 Oncovirus

References

Citations

Sources 

 Pelini P. (1999 2000). "Cancer and metastasis to the lung caused by the bacterium Pseudomonas". Rome, Italy: Figshare. ..

Bacteria
Infectious causes of cancer